Epacris barbata, commonly known as bearded heath, is a species of flowering plant in the heath family Ericaceae and is endemic to a restricted area of Tasmania. It is an erect shrub with lance-shaped leaves and white, tube-shaped flowers with hairy sepals.

Description
The leaves are sharply pointed and the edges curve downwards. The flowers are arranged singly in leaf axils near the tips of the branches, white and more or less sessile. Flowering occurs in spring.

Taxonomy and naming
Epacris barbata was first formally described in 1952 by Ronald Melville in the Kew Bulletin from specimens collected by Winifred Curtis at Coles Bay in 1946. The specific epithet (barbata) means "bearded".

Distribution and habitat
Bearded heath is restricted to the Freycinet Peninsula and nearby Schouten Island where it grows in heath and heathy woodland on granite.

Conservation status
Epacris barbata is classified as "endangered" under the Australian Government Environment Protection and Biodiversity Conservation Act 1999 and the Tasmanian Government Threatened Species Protection Act 1995. The main threat to the species is dieback due to the fungus Phytophthora cinnamomi.

References

barbata
Ericales of Australia
Flora of Tasmania
Plants described in 1952